Tjakko de Vos (born July 2, 1956) is a Dutch former professional ice hockey player.

He competed as a member of the Netherlands men's national ice hockey team at the 1981 World Ice Hockey Championships.

References

1956 births
Living people
Amstel Tijgers players
Dutch ice hockey forwards
Sportspeople from Rotterdam